Lisa Graf (born 13 November 1992) is a German competitive swimmer who specializes in backstroke. At the 2016 Summer Olympics in Rio de Janeiro she competes in the 200 meter backstroke. She qualified in tied 4th place for the semifinals where she was eliminated with a 13th place.

At the 2014 European Aquatics Championships in Berlin, she finished 4th in the 200 meter backstroke. At the 2012 European Championships, she won a gold medley relay medal for swimming in the heats.

References

1992 births
Living people
German female backstroke swimmers
Swimmers at the 2016 Summer Olympics
Olympic swimmers of Germany
European Aquatics Championships medalists in swimming
Swimmers from Leipzig